The U. S. Post Office is a historic building located in Kingman, Arizona. The post office was built in 1935. The design of the post office is Period Revival with Italian influence. Louis A. Simon was the Supervisor Architect and Neal A. Melick was the Supervisor Engineer. The first post office building for Kingman, the earlier post offices were located in stores. Today the post office is owned by the City of Kingman and is used for office space in the downtown area. It is across the street from the Little Red School and around the corner of the street of the old Elks Lodge.

The building was listed on the National Register of Historic Places in 1986. It was evaluated for National Register listing as part of a 1985 study of 63 historic resources in Kingman that led to this and many others being listed.

See also 
List of United States post offices

References 

Buildings and structures in Kingman, Arizona
Kingman
Government buildings completed in 1935
National Register of Historic Places in Kingman, Arizona